The Suva-Nausori corridor is made up of 3 municipalities of Suva, Nasinu and Nausori.  The Suva-Nausori corridor host two roads – Kings Road is the main road and Ratu Dovi Road which travels from Suva to Laqere.  
The poles of the Suva-Nausori corridor are Suva and Nausori and they are about 19 km apart.

Suva